Ajit Vachhani (10 August, 1951 – 25 August, 2003) was an Indian film and television actor. He had worked in many Hindi films as a character actor, including  Mr. India (1987) (as "Teja"), Maine Pyar Kiya (1989), Kabhi Haan Kabhi Naa (1993), Hum Aapke Hain Koun..! (1994) and Hum Saath Saath Hain (1999), the two latter being some of his most popular and well-earning movies of all time. He acted in over 50 Hindi films, one Marathi cinema 'Eka Peksha Ek' besides three Sindhi movies. He also acted in television serials including Hasratein, Daane Anaar Ke and Ek Mahal Ho Sapno Ka. and  Mitti ke rang (story bus stand ki ek raat)

Career
Ajit started his TV career with Samvaad Video's Bante Bigadte (1985), produced by Rakesh Chaudhary, and soon become a popular face on the television and soon he was appearing in Hindi films.

Vachhani has acted in over 50 Hindi films, three Sindhi films and was a regular in Gujarati and Marathi plays. He acted in Sooraj Barjatya's Maine Pyaar Kiya, Hum Aapke Hain Koun and Hum Saath-Saath Hain. Other films of his include Mr India, Aankhen, Har Dil Jo Pyar Karega, Phir Bhi Dil Hai Hindustani and Kabhi Haan Kabhi Naa.

Vachhani's last serial, Ek Mahal Ho Sapnon Ka, ran for 1,000 episodes in Gujarati, Hindi and Marathi. He made a name in the industry as a character artiste.

Personal life
He died in Mumbai on 25 August 2003, at the age of 52, after a prolonged illness and was survived by his wife Charusheela Sable and two daughters.

Filmography

Films

 Jhoothi (1985)
 Khamosh (1985)
 Mr. India (1987)
 Yeh Woh Manzil To Nahin (1987)
 Qayamat Se Qayamat Tak (1988)
 Commando (1988)
 Main Azaad Hoon (1989)
 Tridev (1989)
 Elaan-E-Jung (1989)
 Maine Pyar Kiya (1989)
 Eka Peksha Ek (1989) (Marathi film)
 College Girl (1990)
 100 Days (1991)
 Aag Laga Do Sawan Ko (1991)
 Khooni Panja (1991)
  Gruhpravesh (1992) (Marathi film)
 Jaan Tere Naam (1992)
 Jo Jeeta Wohi Sikandar (1992)
 Deedar (1992)
 Suryavanshi (1992)
 Raju Ban Gaya Gentleman (1992)
Bomb Blast (1993 film)
 Kabhi Haan Kabhi Naa (1993)
 Lootere (1993)
Roop Ki Rani Choron Ka Raja (1993)
 Dil Ki Baazi (1993)
 Chhoti Bahoo (1994)
 Dilwale (1994)
Beta Ho To Aisa (1994)
 Hum Aapke Hain Koun..! (1994)
 Policewala Gunda (1995)
 Ahankaar (1995)
 Aisi Bhi Kya Jaldi Hai (1996)
 Yash (1996)
 Naseeb (1997)
 Teri Mohabbat Ke Naam (1999)
Sirf Tum (1999)
 Hum Saath-Saath Hain: We Stand United (1999)
 Har Dil Jo Pyar Karega (2000)
 Kyo Kii... Main Jhuth Nahin Bolta (2001)
 Jodi No.1 (2001)
 Aankhen (2002)

Television

References

External links 
 

Male actors from Mumbai
1951 births
2003 deaths
Indian male television actors
Sindhi people
Male actors in Hindi television
Male actors in Hindi cinema
20th-century Indian male actors
21st-century Indian male actors